Crystal Simorgh for Best Director is an award presented annually by the Fajr International Film Festival held in Iran. It is given in honor of a film director who has exhibited outstanding directing.

Winners and nominees

Most wins and nominations

Notes

References 

Awards for best director
Director